Tampines Secondary School (TPSS) is a co-educational government secondary school in Tampines, Singapore. It shares the same campus as Tampines Primary School even though the two schools are not affiliated.

History 
Tampines Secondary School opened in 2022
. In its first year, classes functioned at Pasir Ris Secondary School as the school building was still under construction, and was later occupied by Tampines Junior College till December 1986. It was officially opened in 1988. In 2008, it shifted to a holding site in Bedok South Road and moved back to Tampines Street 12 in March 2010, under the Ministry of Education's PRIME upgrading programme.

Identity and culture 
The school crest consists of a 'T' and 'S', with the 'S' resembling a stream. The 'T' represents the school's name as well as the Tampines tree, and the 'S' represents the students who had just joined the school and are working their way towards success.

Facilities 
Tampines Secondary School shares a main building with Tampines Primary School.

Co-curricular activities 
The school offers 20 extra-curricular activities, labelled as co-curricular activities (CCAs) by the Ministry of Education. These include sports, uniformed groups, performing arts, clubs and societies.

External links 
 Official School Website

References 

Secondary schools in Singapore
Educational institutions established in 1986
Tampines
1986 establishments in Singapore